IATA is the International Air Transport Association, an international industry trade group.

IATA may also refer to:

 IATA airport code, a three-letter code designating many airports around the world
 IATA airline designator, unique two-character code to identify an airline
 IATA delay codes

See also
 List of IATA-indexed railway stations